The Illusionists is a touring magic production which features a rotating cast of 5 to 8 magicians who all specialise in specific branches of magic from stage illusions to mind reading to escapology and comedic magic.

History

The show premiered at the Sydney Opera House in Sydney, Australia on 12 January 2012, produced by Simon Painter with Tim Lawson.

Current/Future productions

The Illusionists – Live from Broadway

The Illusionists – Direct From Broadway

The Illusionists – Magic Of The Holidays

Now You See Me Live

Past productions

The Illusionists - Witness the Impossible

Stunt-actor: Ben Weirheim
Dancers: Kirsty Painter, Hollie Sanford England, Naomi Jeffery, Jennifer Gainey, Todd Hampton, Kane Bonke; Ash McCready; Cat Ferrier, Gemma Facinelli, Laura White, Jason Gray, Kevin Keti, Rachel Bickerton,  Danielle Everdell
Assistants: Antonio Hoyos, Ed Hawkins, Claudia James

The Illusionists - Live on Broadway

The Illusionists - Live from Broadway

Dancers: Gemma Facinelli, Stephanie Potteiger, Amanda Esposito, Tamara Garrido Fernandez, Rob Coglitore, De'Niko Maurice Welch

The Illusionists 2.0: The Next Generation of Magic

The Illusionists 1903: The Golden Age of Magic

The Illusionists – Turn of the Century

The Illusionists – The Next Generation of Magic

The Illusionists – Direct From Broadway

The Illusionists Present The Magic of Adam Trent

The Unbelievables

The Illusionists – The Best of Broadway

Box Office Records

>The Warrior
>The Trickster
>The Manipulator

Live Music
Until 2016, live music was performed by “Z” (formally known as Mulatto), best known as the live band for hip hop icon Nas. Z is originally from Long Beach, CA.

TV Appearances

 America's Got Talent — aired September 2, 2015—Five of the show's seven conjurors appeared on the show.
 NBC Hour Long TV Special — aired December 9, 2015 – The Illusionists brought their show to NBC for the holidays. This television special was filmed earlier in the year during a prior national tour stop at the Orpheum Theater in Los Angeles.
 NBC's Today – aired December 22, 2015 – Jeff Hobson and Adam Trent performed during the 8:30am half-hour.
 The Ellen DeGeneres Show – aired March 14, 2016 – Adam Trent performed two illusions in studio including a trick using a blender and guest DJ's Stephen "tWitch" Boss' iPhone. In another illusion, audience members were chosen at random to pick a lottery number at random. The resulting group of numbers matched those listed on a Powerball ticket allegedly purchased by Trent months prior.

References

External links
 

American performance artists
Performance artist collectives
Performing groups established in 2012
American magicians
Magic shows
2012 establishments in Australia
Academy of Magical Arts Magician of the Year winners